The Smith-McDowell House is a  brick mansion located in Asheville, North Carolina. It is one of the "finest antebellum buildings in Western North Carolina." Listed on the National Register of Historic Places, it was the first mansion built in Asheville and is the oldest surviving brick structure in Buncombe County.

History

19th century 
The house was constructed  for James McConnell Smith on a portion of the land grant issued to his father, Colonel Daniel Smith, as payment for Revolutionary War service. James Smith was the second mayor of Asheville and one of the wealthiest landowners and businessmen in the region. His businesses included a toll bridge across the French Broad River, the Buck Hotel, a tannery, a gristmill, a sawmill, and a mercantile. Smith's choice of brick for his farmhouse was a show of wealth as this building material was atypical for antebellum Western North Carolina.

After Smith a died in 1859, the house was auctioned as part of his estate. The McDowells raised eight children in their home and lived there until 1880 when post-Civil War financial difficulties forced them to sell.

In 1881, Alexander Garrett purchased and modernized the house, including connecting the summer kitchen to the main house and adding a solarium, Italianate windows, and a metal roof to replace the original wood shingles. Garret built the Oakland Inn down the road from his house and became the mayor of the town of Victoria, a small community built on former Smith-McDowell plantation property.

20th century 
Van Bergen hired Frederick Law Olmsted Jr., the son of the then-deceased Frederick Law Olmsted, to design a landscape plan for the property. Socialite Caroline Bates McKee purchased the house in 1909, followed by Brewster Chapman in 1913. Chapman hired architect Richard Sharp Smith, previously supervising architect for the construction of Biltmore, to redesign the interior of the main level. Changes included adding a side entrance, bathrooms, new mantles on the main level, mahogany doors, and oak flooring throughout. Exterior changes included adding decorative caps to the chimneys and the addition of a red slate roof.

In 1951, Smith–McDowell House was converted into classrooms (main level) and a dormitory (upper two levels) for a private high school. Years of neglect, followed by the school's closing, had ravaged the structure that was part of land acquisition by Asheville-Buncombe Technical Community College in 1961. In 1974, the Western North Carolina Historical Association leased the house from the community college and began its restoration. Under the supervision of  architect Henry Gaines, the restoration took six years. 

Smith-McDowell House was listed on the National Register of Historic Places in 1975. The association opened Smith-McDowell House Museum on May 31, 1981.

Architecture 
The three-story Smith-McDowell House is a blend of architectural styles dating from its original 1840 construction and the additions completed in the late 19th and early 20th centuries. The original architect and builder of the house are unknown, although family tradition says the plans were brought from England. Also, the surviving original interior woodwork is similar to that made by Ephraim Clayton who was active in the area at the time.

The floor plan is typical of Federal style. It is a double-pile plan, Flemish bond, five-bay mansion that features a double-tier porch that is semi-engaged beneath an extension of its gable roof. Each three-bay end wall has a pair of chimneys.

The original Federal character that dominated the house's exterior remains in the large fanlight above the front doors and in the delicacy of the front porch that is supported by twelve slender fluted columns (six on each level). The house has corbelled cornices that feature dentils. The exterior of the building at one time displayed penciling, and remnants remain in several spots. 

Although much of the dwelling's original Greek Revival interior woodwork was replaced during a Neoclassical style remodeling in 1913, the second floor's mantels, window frames, and door frames are original, dating from the 1840s. A one-story semicircular solarium was added to the southern end wall in the late 1880s.

There are two remaining brick outbuildings from the plantation era, both located near the rear of the house: the summer kitchen, which is now attached to the main house, and a dependency formerly used for salt curing and as laundry.

WNC Historical Association 
Today, Smith-McDowell House is a part of the campus of Asheville-Buncombe Technical Community College and is operated by the Western North Carolina Historical Association as a nonprofit museum. The museum is organized as a timeline house museum, showing how families lived during the late 19th and early 20th-centuries.

References

External links

Western North Carolina Historical Association: Smith-McDowell House Museum

Houses on the National Register of Historic Places in North Carolina
Museums in Asheville, North Carolina
Historic house museums in North Carolina
Houses completed in 1840
National Register of Historic Places in Buncombe County, North Carolina
Houses in Asheville, North Carolina